José Pires de Almeida Neto, born in 1954 in São Paulo, is a Brazilian guitarist known for playing jazz. In addition to acoustic and electric guitars, he plays an electric nylon string guitar with polysubbass strings.

Life
Neto started learning guitar from his mother at the age of four and began classical guitar lessons at the age of twelve, later studying at the music academy in his hometown. Beginning in 1970, he taught the guitar and had his own band, "Plato". In 1978 he became a member of Harry Belafonte's band. In 1982 Neto moved to San Francisco and was soon playing with Tânia Maria, Paquito D’Rivera, Hugh Masekela, Herbie Mann, and Airto Moreira. In 1990 he became the musical director and composer for the band Fourth World, along with Moreira and Flora Purim. He also has recorded with George Benson. Since 2001, he has played with the Netoband, playing at various festivals through Europe and the United States. As a result, Neto joined Steve Winwood's band as their 2003 world tour began. He has been seen performing with Winwood on The View, Good Morning America, and Late Night with David Letterman, among other national television programs.

He has lived in Fairfax, California since the 1980s.

Discography
 Mountains and the Sea (1987), with Randy Tico, Airto Moreira, and Flora Purim on Water lily acoustics
 Neto (1993)
 Seventh Wave – The Lucky One (2000)
 Newspaper Girl (2012)

with Harry Belafonte
Paradise in Gazankulu

with Fourth World
Fourth World Recorded live at Ronnie Scott's (1992)
Fourth World (1994)
Fourth World [live] (1995)
Encounters of the Fourth World (1995)
Last Journey (1999)

with Steve Winwood
About Time (2003)
Nine Lives (2008)

Lexicographical entry
 Martin Kunzler, Jazz-Lexikon Bd. 2. Reinbek 2002;

References

External links
 Official website

People from Fairfax, California
Brazilian jazz guitarists
Brazilian male guitarists
Jazz fusion guitarists
Lead guitarists
Brazilian jazz composers
1954 births
Living people
Male jazz composers